Burdett is an unincorporated community in northwest Bates County, in the U.S. state of Missouri. The community is on Missouri Route FF approximately seven miles west northwest of Adrian.

History
Burdett was platted in 1870, and named after Samuel Swinfin Burdett, a state legislator. A post office called Burdett was established in 1870, and remained in operation until 1904.

References

Unincorporated communities in Bates County, Missouri
Unincorporated communities in Missouri